The men's Laser competition at the 2016 Summer Olympics in Rio de Janeiro took place between 8–16 August at Marina da Glória. Eleven races (the last one a medal race) were held.

Schedule

Results

Further reading

References 

Men's Laser
Laser (dinghy) competitions
Men's events at the 2016 Summer Olympics